Dizmar-e Gharbi Rural District is in Siah Rud District of Jolfa County, East Azerbaijan province, Iran. At the National Census of 2006, its population was 3,437 in 853 households. There were 3,467 inhabitants in 931 households at the following census of 2011. At the most recent census of 2016, the population of the rural district was 3,191 in 1,021 households. The largest of its five villages was Iri-ye Sofla, with 1,800 people.

References 

Jolfa County

Rural Districts of East Azerbaijan Province

Populated places in East Azerbaijan Province

Populated places in Jolfa County